Henry Hastings may refer to:
Henry de Hastings (died 1268)  alias Henry de Hastings, 1st Baron Hastings (a "de Montfort" invalid peerage)
Henry Hastings, 3rd Earl of Huntingdon (c. 1535–1595), English nobleman, puritan and politician
Henry Hastings (sportsman) (1551–1650), English landowner and eccentric country sportsman
Henry Hastings, 5th Earl of Huntingdon (1586–1643), English nobleman and literary patron
Henry Hastings, 1st Baron Loughborough (1610–1666/7), English Royalist army commander
Henry Hastings (actor) (1879–1963), American actor who was in Tomorrow Is Forever
Henry Hastings (MP) (died 1629), English politician

See also
Henry Hastings Sibley (1811–1891), first governor of Minnesota, USA